The San Fernando massacre, was an episode that took place on 21 December 1868, on the eve of the Battle of Lomas Valentinas, during the Pikysyry Campaign in the Paraguayan War, which consisted of the summary trial and execution of hundreds of prisoners by order of Paraguayan president Francisco Solano López. Some prisoners were accused of plotting an alleged conspiracy to overthrow López. Among the dead was López's own brother, Benigno López.

The massacre

López left Humaitá with his troops in March 1868 and set camp in San Fernando, where he learned that many government officials were plotting to betray him and negotiate peace with the allies, including his brother Benigno López. 

López then formed a council of war to try the conspirators, where hundreds were executed. For the task, López sent colonel Hilario Marcó on 21 December 1868. Among the dead were: José Berges and Gumersindo Benítez, former ministers of Foreign Affairs of Paraguay, general José María Bruguez, general Vicente Barrios, former minister of War and Navy and brother-in-law of López, colonel Manuel Núñez, colonel Paulino Alén Benítez, sergeant major Vicente Mora, bishop of Paraguay Manuel Antonio Palacios, dean Eugenio Bogado, priest Vicente Bazán, priest Juan Bautista Zalduondo, Carlos Riveros, Saturnino Bedoya, also brother-in-law of López, Gaspar López, Juliana Insfrán de Martínez, wife of colonel Francisco Martínez, defender of Humaitá, shot in the back as "traitor of the fatherland and the Supreme Government", Dolores Recalde, María de Jesús Egusquiza Quevedo, the Portuguese consul José Maria Leite Pereira, the leader of the Uruguayan Blanco Party Antonio de Las Carreras, the former secretary of the Uruguayan Legation Francisco Rodríguez Larrata, the Italian captain Simón Fidanza, among many others.

References

Citations

Bibliography 
 

Paraguayan War
Massacres in 1868
Massacres in Paraguay
December 1868 events
19th-century murders in Paraguay